Rupert Weinstabl (20 November 1911 – 7 September 1953) was an Austrian sprint canoeist who competed in the 1930s.

At the 1936 Summer Olympics in Berlin, he won two medals with his partner Karl Proisl with a silver in the C-2 1000 m and a bronze in the C-2 10000 m events.

Weinstabl also won two medals at the 1938 ICF Canoe Sprint World Championships in Vaxholm with a gold in the C-2 1000 m and silver in the C-2 10000 m events. He competed for Germany because it had annexed Austria at the time of the championships.

References
DatabaseOlympics.com profile

Sports-reference.com profile

1911 births
1953 deaths
Austrian male canoeists
Canoeists at the 1936 Summer Olympics
Olympic canoeists of Austria
Olympic bronze medalists for Austria
Olympic medalists in canoeing
ICF Canoe Sprint World Championships medalists in Canadian
Medalists at the 1936 Summer Olympics
Olympic silver medalists for Austria
People from Bruck an der Leitha District
Sportspeople from Lower Austria